Luis Pérez is a former Negro league third baseman who played in the 1940s.

Pérez played for the Indianapolis Clowns in 1948. In 11 recorded games, he posted seven hits and five RBI in 31 plate appearances.

References

External links
 and Seamheads

Year of birth missing
Place of birth missing
Indianapolis Clowns players
Baseball third basemen